Douglas High School Old Boys A.F.C. (DHSOB AFC) are a football club from Onchan on the Isle of Man. They compete in the Isle of Man Football League and wear a blue and white kit. They play their home games at Blackberry Lane in Onchan.

History
Formed in 1926, they have been Isle of Man Football League champions six times and won the Manx FA Cup ten times, including four consecutive FA Cup triumphs from 1964–65 to 1967–68.

They have a reserve team that play in the Isle of Man Football Combination.

Facilities
DHSOB have a clubhouse and operate a campsite each year during the annual Isle of Man TT motorcycle racing.

Honours

League
Division One champions (6): 1966–67, 1982–83, 1988–89, 1989–90, 1990–91, 1996–97
Division one combination champions:2011–12 2014-15, 2016–17

Cup
Manx FA Cup (10): 1964–65, 1965–66, 1966–67, 1967–68, 1969–70, 1982–83, 1988–89, 1990–91, 1991–92, 1995–96
Hospital Cup (3): 1987–88, 1994–95, 2008–09, 2013-14
Railway Cup (5): 1988–89, 1991–92, 1993–94, 1995–96, 1999–2000
Woods Cup (1): 2006–07
Paul Henry Gold Cup (1): 2006–07

References

External links
Douglas High School Old Boys A.F.C. on Pitchero

Football clubs in the Isle of Man
1926 establishments in the Isle of Man
Association football clubs established in 1926